Those Happy Days can refer to:

 Those Happy Days (1914 film), a 1914 silent film
 Those Happy Days (2006 film), a 2006 French film